Alma Zadić (born 24 May 1984) is a Bosnian-born Austrian lawyer and politician of the Green Party. She has been serving as Minister of Justice since 7 January 2020 in the governments of Chancellors Sebastian Kurz, Alexander Schallenberg and Karl Nehammer.

Early life, education, and early career 
Born in Tuzla, Zadić fled to Austria with her parents in 1994 during the Bosnian War and the family settled in Vienna. She has been described as a Muslim, but denies any religious affiliation herself.

She studied law at the University of Vienna and at the Università Cattolica del Sacro Cuore in Piacenza before getting a Fulbright scholarship for a postgraduate law degree at Columbia University in New York. While being a student, she worked as a junior legal researcher at the International Organization for Migration (IOM) in Vienna and as an intern at the International Criminal Tribunal for the former Yugoslavia in The Hague. She was also a competitive volleyball player and fitness coach.

Before entering politics, Zadić worked for six years as a senior associate at the Vienna office of London-headquartered multinational law firm Freshfields Bruckhaus Deringer, specialising in human rights issues.

Political career 
Zadić ran for the Austrian Green Party in the 2019 Austrian legislative election and was elected to the National Council.

On 7 January 2020, Zadić, along with three other Greens, was sworn in by Austria's president Alexander Van der Bellen to serve in the Sebastian Kurz coalition government as Minister of Justice pursuant to the coalition agreement of Kurz's ÖVP with the Greens, led by Werner Kogler, who serves as Vice Chancellor.

Zadić remained in the same role when Alexander Schallenberg set up a new government following Kurz's resignation in October 2021.

Court process
On social media, Zadić shared a photograph in which a member of a Burschenschaft was seen giving a Nazi salute, with the comment "No tolerance for neo-Nazis, fascists and racists". In November 2019, she was found guilty of defamation and fined 700 euros by a criminal court in Vienna. While Zadić chose not to appeal the conviction further, her party colleague Karl Öllinger who was found guilty in a related case successfully appealed against his verdict in 2021.

References 

1984 births
Living people
Austrian people of Bosnia and Herzegovina descent
Bosnia and Herzegovina emigrants to Austria
Female justice ministers
21st-century Austrian women politicians
21st-century Austrian politicians
Politicians from Vienna
Columbia Law School alumni
University of Vienna alumni
Justice ministers of Austria
The Greens – The Green Alternative politicians
Yugoslav Wars refugees
Women government ministers of Austria
Politicians from Tuzla